This is a list of the first minority male lawyer(s) and judge(s) in Kansas. It includes the year in which the men were admitted to practice law (in parentheses). Also included are men who achieved other distinctions such becoming the first in their state to graduate from law school or become a political figure.

Firsts in Kansas' history

Lawyer 

 First African American male: John H. Morris (1871)

State judges 

 First African American male: Cordell D. Meeks Sr. (1939) in 1972 
 First Asian American male: Tommy B. Webb in 1988 
 First African American male (Third Judicial District): Joseph D. Johnson in 2005

Federal judges 
First Hispanic-American male (U.S. District Court for the District of Kansas): Carlos Murguia (1982) in 1999

United States Attorney 

 First African American male: Benjamin E. Franklin from 1968-1969

District Attorney 

 First African American male: Mark A. Dupree, Sr. in 2017

Firsts in local history 

 G.W. Jones: First African American male to serve as the County Attorney for Graham County, Kansas (1896)
 Joseph D. Johnson: First African American male appointed as a Judge of the Third Judicial District in Kansas (2005) [Shawnee County, Kansas]
 Mark A. Dupree, Sr.: First African American to serve as the District Attorney of Wyandotte County, Kansas (2017)

See also 

 List of first minority male lawyers and judges in the United States

Other topics of interest 

 List of first women lawyers and judges in the United States
 List of first women lawyers and judges in Kansas

References 

 
Minority, Kansas, first
Minority, Kansas, first
Legal history of Kansas
Lists of people from Kansas
Kansas lawyers